Hana Dostalová (1890–1981) was a Czech painter, illustrator, textile and glass designer . She was the daughter of actress Marie Horská-Kallmünzerová, sister of actress Leopolda Dostalová and director Karel Dostal.

Literature
TOMAN, Prokop. Nový slovník československých výtvarných umělců. 3. vyd. Svazek 1. Praha : Rudolf Ryšavý, 1947. Heslo Dostálová, Hana, s. 172.
TOMAN, Prokop; TOMAN, Prokop Hugo. Nový slovník československých výtvarných umělců. 3. vyd. Svazek 3. Praha : SNKLHU, 1955. Heslo Dostálová, Hana.

See also
List of Czech painters

References

20th-century Czech painters
20th-century Czech women artists
1890 births
1981 deaths
Czech illustrators
Czech women painters
Czech women illustrators